Sar Tang or Sar-e Tang may refer to:

Chaharmahal and Bakhtiari Province
Sar Tang, Chaharmahal and Bakhtiari, a village in Ardal County
Sartang-e Badam Shirin, a village in Kuhrang County
Sartang-e Dinar Ali, a village in Lordegan County
Sar Tang-e Mesen, a village in Lordegan County

Fars Province
Sar Tang, Fars, a village in Sepidan County
Sar Tang-e Bala, a village in Darab County
Sartang-e Bozorg, a village in Mamasani County
Sar Tang-e Kuchak, a village in Mamasani County

Hormozgan Province
Sar Tang, Hormozgan, a village in Khamir County
Sar Tang-e Darreh Shir, a village in Hajjiabad County

Ilam Province
Sartang, Ilam, a village in Eyvan County
Sar Tang-e Olya, a village in Eyvan County
Shahrak-e Sartang-e Bijar, a village in Ilam County
Shahrak-e Sartang, a village in Shirvan and Chardaval County

Kerman Province
Sar Tang-e Darrehi, a village in Faryab County

Kermanshah Province
Sartang, Kermanshah, a village in Dalahu County

Khuzestan Province
Sar Tang, Andika, a village in Andika County
Sar Tang, Chelo, a village in Andika County
Sar Tang-e Dulab, a village in Andika County
Sar Tang-e Gadarkhani, a village in Andika County
Sartang-e Galal Sharb, a village in Bagh-e Malek County
Sar Tang-e Soleyman Koshteh, a village in Bagh-e Malek County
Sar Tang, Izeh, a village in Izeh County
Sartang-e Faleh, a village in Izeh County
Sartang-e Shab Kuri, a village in Izeh County
Sar Tang, Lali, a village in Lali County
Sar Tang, Ramhormoz, a village in Ramhormoz County

Kohgiluyeh and Boyer-Ahmad Province
Sar Tang, Basht, a village in Basht County
Sartang, Sepidar, a village in Boyer-Ahmad County
Sar Tang-e Firuzabad, a village in Boyer-Ahmad County
Sar Tang-e Pivareh, a village in Boyer-Ahmad County
Sartang-e Tang Sorkh, a village in Boyer-Ahmad County
Sar Tang-e Deh Kohneh Hamidabad, a village in Dana County
Sartang-e Ravaq, a village in Dana County
Sartang-e Tomanak, a village in Dana County
Sar Tang-e Tut-e Nadeh, a village in Dana County
Sar Tang ol Majan, a village in Kohgiluyeh County
Sartang-e Lirab, a village in Kohgiluyeh County
Sartang-e Landeh, a village in Landeh County
Sar Tang-e Mugarmun, a village in Landeh County

Lorestan Province
Sartang-e Barzeh, a village in Aligudarz County
Sar Tang Mahi, a village in Aligudarz County
Sar Tang-e Bid Gijeh, a village in Khorramabad County
Sar Tang-e Eslamabad, a village in Khorramabad County
Sar Tang-e Leyshan, a village in Khorramabad County

West Azerbaijan Province
Sar Tang, West Azerbaijan, a village in Mahabad County
Sartang, alternate name of Sartan, Iran, a village in Mahabad County